Stephen Harriman Long (December 30, 1784 – September 4, 1864) was an American army civil engineer, explorer, and inventor.  As an inventor, he is noted for his developments in the design of steam locomotives. He was also one of the most prolific explorers of the early 1800s, although his career as an explorer was relatively short-lived. He covered over 26,000 miles in five expeditions, including a scientific expedition in the Great Plains area, which he famously confirmed as a "Great Desert" (leading to the term "the Great American Desert").

Biography
Long was born in Hopkinton, New Hampshire, the son of Moses and Lucy (Harriman) Long. Long's Puritan ancestors came from England during the Puritan migration to New England. He received an A.B. from Dartmouth College in 1809 and an A.M. from Dartmouth in 1812.  In 1814, he was commissioned a lieutenant of engineers in the U.S. Army Corps of Engineers. Upon the reorganization of the Army in 1816, he was appointed a Major on 16 April and assigned to the Southern Division under Maj. Gen. Andrew Jackson as a topographical engineer.

In 1817, Major Long headed a military excursion up the Mississippi River to the Falls of St. Anthony near the confluence with the Minnesota River. As a result of his recommendations, the Army established Fort Snelling to guard against Indian incursions against settlers in the Upper Mississippi Valley. Long recorded his experiences of the expedition in a journal, which was first published as Voyage in a Six-oared Skiff to the Falls of St. Anthony, by the Minnesota Historical Society in 1860.

In March 1819 he married Martha Hodgkiss of Philadelphia, the sister of Isabella Hodgkiss Norvell, wife of US Senator John Norvell. Soon afterwards he led the scientific contingent of the 1819 Yellowstone Expedition to explore the Missouri River. In 1820 he was appointed to lead an alternative expedition through the American West, exploring areas acquired in the Louisiana Purchase. The specific purpose of the voyage was to find the sources of the Platte, Arkansas, and Red rivers.

Later, in 1823 he led additional military expeditions into the United States borderlands with Canada, exploring the Upper Mississippi Valley, the Minnesota River, the Red River of the North and across the southern part of Canada. During this time he determined the northern boundary at the 49th parallel at Pembina. In that same year, he was elected to the American Philosophical Society.

Following his official military expeditions, Major Long spent several years on detached duty as a consulting engineer with various railroads. Initially he helped to survey and build the Baltimore and Ohio Railroad. In 1826, he received his first patent for his work on railroad steam locomotives.  Long received many more patents for locomotive design and worked with other Army engineers in planning and building the railroad. Long also received patents in 1830 and 1839 for pre-stressing the trusses used in wooden covered bridges.

In 1832, along with William Norris and several other business partners, he formed the American Steam Carriage Company.  The business was dissolved in 1834 due to the difficulties in placing Long's locomotive designs into production. From June to November, 1836, Long led two parties of about 15 each to conduct a survey of a route inland from the shores of the Penobscot Bay at Belfast, Maine to Quebec for the proposed Belfast & Quebec Railroad which had been chartered by the State of Maine on March 6, 1836. In his report to Governor Robert P. Dunlap of Maine, Col. Long recommended a route into Quebec of 227 miles from "Belfast to the Forks of the Kennebec, and by a line of levels thence to the Canadian line." However a then provision in the Maine Constitution which prohibited public loans for purposes such as building railroads as well as the financial panic of 1837 intervened to kill the project.

Colonel Long received a leave of absence to work on the newly incorporated Western & Atlantic Railroad in Georgia. His yearly salary was established at $5,000, the contract was signed May 12, 1837, and he served as the chief engineer for the W&A until November 3, 1840. He arrived in north Georgia in late May and his surveying began in July and by November he had submitted an initial report which the construction followed almost exactly.

In 1838 he was appointed to a position in the newly separated U.S. Corps of Topographical Engineers. Like most of their officers Major Long remained loyal to the Federal government during the Civil War, and he became Colonel of the Corps in 1861 until its merger back into the U.S. Corps of Engineers in 1863. He died in Alton, Illinois in 1864.

Expeditions

Great Plains (1820)

Like most engineers, Long was college-trained, interested in searching for order in the natural world, and willing to work with the modern technology of the time. Topographical engineers had basically two unique points of view that set them apart from the other pioneers — geographical and technological.

In 1818 he was appointed to organize a scientific contingent to accompany soldiers of Col. Henry Atkinson's command on the Yellowstone Expedition (sometimes called the Atkinson-Long Expedition). This was planned to explore the upper Missouri, and Long spent the autumn designing the construction of an experimental steamboat for the venture, Western Engineer. Departing from St. Louis in June 1819, it was the first steamboat to travel up the Missouri River into the Louisiana Purchase, and the first steamboat to have a stern paddle wheel. On September 17, Long's party arrived at Fort Lisa, a trading fort belonging to William Clark's Missouri Fur Company. It was about five miles south of Council Bluffs, Iowa. Long's group built their winter quarters nearby and called it "Engineer Cantonment."

Within a month, Long returned to the east coast, and by the following May, his orders had changed. The Yellowstone Expedition had become a costly failure and so instead of exploring the Missouri River, President James Monroe decided to have Long lead an expedition up the Platte River to the Rocky mountains and back along the border with the Spanish colonies. Exploring that border was vital, since John Quincy Adams had just concluded the treaty with Spain, which drew a new U.S. border to the Pacific.

Major Long was the leader of the first scientific exploration up the Platte, which planned to study the geography and natural resources of the area. His party of 19 men included landscape painter Samuel Seymour, naturalist painter Titian Peale, zoologist Thomas Say and Edwin James, a physician knowledgeable in both geology and botany. James led the first recorded ascent of Pikes Peak during this expedition. On June 6, 1820, they traveled up the north bank of the Platte and met Pawnee and Otoe Indians. On October 14, 1820, 400 Omaha assembled at a meeting with Long, where Chief Big Elk made the following speech:

"Here I am, my Father; all these young people you see around here are yours; although they are poor and little, yet they are your children. All my nation loves the whites and always have loved them. Some think, my Father, that you have brought all these soldiers here to take our land from us but I do not believe it. For although I am a poor simple Indian, I know that this land will not suit your farmers. If I even thought your hearts bad enough to take this land, I would not fear it, as I know there is not wood enough on it for the use of the white."

Long wrote that the Pawnee people were "respectable." After finding and naming Longs Peak and the Rocky Mountains, they journeyed up the South Platte River to the Arkansas River watershed. The expedition was then split, and Long led his group towards the Red River. They missed it, ran into hostile Indians and had to eventually eat their own horses to survive before they finally met the other part of the expedition at Fort Smith (now a city on the western border of the state of Arkansas).

Report
In his report of the 1820 expedition, Long wrote that the Plains from Nebraska to Oklahoma were "unfit for cultivation and of course uninhabitable by a people depending upon agriculture." On the map he made of his explorations, he called the area a "Great Desert."  Long felt the area labeled the "Great Desert" would be better suited as a buffer against the Spanish, British, and Russians, who shared the continent with the United States. He also commented that the eastern wooded portion of the country should be filled up before the republic attempted any further extension westward. He commented that sending settlers to that area was out of the question. Given the technology of the 1820s, Long was right. There was little timber for houses or fuel, minimal surface water, sandy soil, hard winters, vast herds of bison, hostile Indians, and no easy means of communication. However, it is ironic that the native tribes had been living there for centuries and that, by the end of the 19th century, the "Great Desert" had become the nation's breadbasket.

There were two key results of this expedition—a very accurate description of Indian customs and Indian life as they existed among the Omaha, Otoes, and Pawnees and his description of the land west of the Missouri River as a "desert".

Red River of the North (1823)

Major Long's 1823 expedition up the Minnesota River (then known as St. Peter's River), to the headwaters of the Red River of the North, down that river to Pembina and Fort Garry, and thence by canoe across British Canada to Lake Huron is sometimes confused with his initial expedition to the Red River in modern-day Texas and Oklahoma.  The expedition to the Red River of the North was a separate, later appointment which completed a series of explorations conceived of by Lewis Cass and implemented by David Bates Douglass, Henry Schoolcraft, and others besides Major Long.  The 1823 expedition was denoted primarily as a scientific reconnaissance and an evaluation of trade possibilities, but probably had undisclosed military objectives as well, and certainly was viewed with suspicion by British authorities in Canada.  This expedition for a time was joined by the Italian adventurer Giacomo Beltrami, who argued with Long and left the expedition near Fort Garry. The 1823 expedition encouraged American traders to push into the fur trade in Northern Minnesota and Dakota, and fostered the development of the Red River Trails and a colorful chapter of ox cart trade between the Red River Colony and Fort Garry via Pembina and the newly developing towns of Mendota and St. Paul.

Marine Hospitals and Napoleon, Arkansas

In 1837 Congress authorized the building of seven Marine Hospitals. Long was commissioned to build the first hospital for the Treasury Department at Louisville, Kentucky. Long had been commissioned to build the hospital along with his other duties but construction would be delayed until the Mexican War was over. It wasn't until the end of 1845 that work finally began. During the completion of the Louisville Marine Hospital, Long would also start work on building similar Marine Hospitals in Paducah, Kentucky; Natchez, Louisiana and Napoleon, Arkansas. These Marine Hospitals were based upon plans provided by Robert Mills, the architect of the Washington Monument.

Long was commissioned to build the Marine Hospital at Napoleon, Arkansas in 1849. Napoleon, Arkansas was situated at the southern mouth of the Arkansas River. After a completing a survey Long had objections to building at Napoleon because of the tendency for flooding and likelihood that the town would face destruction in the future thanks to the unwieldy Mississippi and Arkansas Rivers. He had petitioned for Helena, Arkansas to be a suitable alternative. In early 1850 Long's objections to the location were rebuffed. Senator Solon Borland, ignoring Long's objections to the location of Napoleon, reported to the Corps of Topographical Engineers that the situation at Napoleon had been discussed before the bill which would create the Marine Hospital at Napoleon was passed. The erection of the hospital at Napoleon without delay was then ordered. In the Spring of 1850 Long requested $10,250 in order to begin construction at Napoleon but it wasn't until August that construction finally started thanks to flooding which hampered building the foundation and cellar. Delays continued to dog the construction and by the Spring of 1851 the supervisor wrote Long suggesting suspension of the work as contracts were expiring due to delays and sickness had been rampant thanks to Spring floods. Work resumed in October 1851 and the slow pace continued over the next three years. By August 1854 the hospital was finally finished but apparently the hospital did not accept its first patients until 1855. The city of Napoleon would be burned in 1862 by General Sherman, but the hospital survived. Federal Forces did not use the hospital for its intended purpose, instead patients were sent elsewhere. While the hospital did survive the war it wouldn't last long.

Long's observations and objections had been accurate. By March 11, 1868 the river had eroded the land to 52 feet from the hospital's doors. Less than a month later, and nearly four years after Long's death, a corner of the hospital fell into the Mississippi River. The entire town of Napoleon was swallowed twenty-eight years after Long first objected to building the hospital at Napoleon.

Of the Marine Hospitals that Long oversaw, the hospital at Louisville, Kentucky, remains today.

See also
New Hampshire Historical Marker No. 179: Smith Bridge
New Hampshire Historical Marker No. 196: Blair Bridge

Notes

References
 Goetzmann, William H. Army Exploration in the American West 1803-1863 (Yale University Press, 1959; University of Nebraska Press, 1979)
 Johnston, James Houstoun, Western and Atlantic Railroad of the State of Georgia, Atlanta, 1931
 Kane, Lucile M., Holmquist, June D., and Gilman, Caroly, eds., The Northern Expeditions of Stephen H. Long: The Journals of 1817 and 1823 and Related Documents (Minnesota Historical Society Press, 1978).
 

 
 Nebraska Studies website 

U.S. Corps of Topographical Engineers - Online Biography of Stephen H. Long

Research resources
 The Journal of Captain John R. Bell: official journalist for the Stephen H. Long Expedition to the Rocky Mountains (1 folder) is housed in the Department of Special Collections and University Archives at Stanford University Libraries

External links

PATRICIA JOHANSON - Timeline Biography - 1940-1967 details a 1600 feet (490 m) length minimalist art sculpture 'Stephen Long', installed by Patricia Johanson in 1968 along an abandoned railroad track in Buskirk, upper New York.

1784 births
1864 deaths
American explorers
Dartmouth College alumni
American people of English descent
American railway civil engineers
Explorers of the United States
People from Hopkinton, New Hampshire
Members of the American Philosophical Society
Military personnel from New Hampshire
United States Army Corps of Topographical Engineers